All Is Forgiven may refer to:

 All Is Forgiven (film), French film
 All Is Forgiven (TV series), American sitcom
 All Is Forgiven (album), a 2005 album by Tex, Don and Charlie

See also
Tout est pardonné (disambiguation) same phrase in frençh